Generalized lymphadenopathy is swollen lymph glands in many areas of the body.

Usually this is in response to a body-wide infectious disease such as influenza and will go away once the person has recovered, but sometimes it can persist long-term, even when there is no obvious cause of disease. This is then called persistent generalized lymphadenopathy (PGL).


Causes
 Infection :
 Viral : Infectious mononucleosis, Infective hepatitis, AIDS
 Bacterial : Tuberculosis, Brucellosis, secondary syphilis, Tularemia
 Protozoal : Toxoplasmosis
 Fungal : Histoplasmosis
 Malignant :
 Leukaemia
 Metastatic carcinoma
 Immunological :
 Systemic lupus erythematosus
 Felty's syndrome
 Still's disease
 Drug hypersensitivity as Hydantoin, Hydralazine, Allopurinol
 Misc. :
 Sarcoidosis
 Amyloidosis
 Lipid storage disease
 Hyperthyroidism

References

External links 

Lymphatic organ diseases